Independent Economic Party may refer to:

 Independent Economic Party (Kenya)
 Independent Economic Party (Namibia)